The Verbandsliga Hessen-Mitte, until 2008 named Landesliga Hessen-Mitte, is currently the sixth tier of the German football league system. Until the introduction of the 3. Liga in 2008 it was the fifth tier of the league system, until the introduction of the Regionalligas in 1994 the fourth tier.

Overview 
The Verbandsliga Hessen-Mitte was formed in 1965 as the Landesliga Hessen-Mitte, a tier four feeder league to the then Amateurliga Hessen.

The winner of the Verbandsliga Mitte automatically qualifies for the Hessenliga, the runners-up need to compete with the runners-up of the Verbandsliga Hessen-Nord and the Verbandsliga Hessen-Süd as well as the 15th placed team of the Hessenliga for another promotion spot.

The Verbandsliga Hessen-Mitte is fed by the Gruppenliga Hessen-Wiesbaden, and Hessen-Gießen/Marburg. The winners of those are automatically promoted to the Verbandsliga, the runners-up play-off for another promotion spot.

Up until 1973 it was common for teams to move between Landesligen, resulting in the fact that some teams have won titles in two different Landesligen. This practice has since stopped.

Along with the renaming of the Oberliga Hessen to Hessenliga in 2008, the Landesliga was renamed Verbandsliga Hessen-Mitte.

League champions 
The league champions:

Verbandsliga 
The league champions since the renaming of the league in 2008:

Landesliga 
The league champions until the renaming of the league in 2008:

 FC Ederbergland hold the record in numbers of titles for the Landesliga Mitte, having won four, the first three under the name of TSV Battenberg. Only SpVgg Bad Homburg hold the same number of titles but those were won in the other two Landesligen – Mitte and Süd.

Additionally promoted teams 
These clubs were promoted to the Oberliga after finishing second in the league:

References

Sources 
 Deutschlands Fußball in Zahlen,  DSFS
 Süddeutschlands Fußballgeschichte in Tabellenform 1897-1988  by Ludolf Hyll
 Die Deutsche Liga-Chronik 1945-2005  DSFS 2006

External links 
 Hessischer Fußball-Verband – HFV 

 

Hessen-Mitte
Football competitions in Hesse
1965 establishments in West Germany